Events from the year 1670 in art.

Events
An inventory of the art collection of Principe Lorenzo Onofrio Colonna lists works by Pietro Paolo Bonzi and many others.
Gerard Reynst publishes Signorum Veterum Icones, a series of prints by Gerard de Lairesse based on the Italian statuary in Reynst's Amsterdam collection.

Paintings

Job Adriaenszoon Berckheyde – The Old Exchange of Amsterdam (approximate date)
Jan de Bray – David Playing the Harp
Isaac Fuller – Self-portrait (approximate date)
Cornelis Norbertus Gysbrechts – Trompe-l'œil: The Reverse of a Framed Painting (approximate date)
Jacob Ochtervelt – Musical Company in an Interior (approximate date)
Jacob Isaakszoon van Ruisdael – The windmill at Wijk bij Duurstede (approximate date)
Jan Vermeer – The Lacemaker

Births
January 26 – Jacob van Schuppen, Austrian painter (died 1751)
April 23 – Cassandra Willoughby, Duchess of Chandos, English historian, travel writer and artist (died 1735)
August 24 – Louis Galloche, French painter (died 1761)
date unknown
Louis Audran, French engraver (died 1712)
François Boitard, French painter (died 1715)
Grigory Musikiysky, Russian painter (died 1740)
Arcangelo Resani, Italian painter of animals and hunted game (died 1740)

Deaths
January 18 – Andrea Vaccaro, Italian Caravaggisti painter of a tenebrist style (born 1600)
May 21 – Giovanni Andrea Sirani, Bolognese painter (born 1610)
June – Hendrik Martenszoon Sorgh, Dutch painter of the baroque era (born 1610)
June 15 – Louis Lerambert, French sculptor from family of artists (born 1620)
November 3 (buried) – Salomon van Ruysdael, Dutch Golden Age landscape painter (born 1602)
November 5 - Viviano Codazzi, Italian architectural painter (born 1604)
November 26 – Jacob van Loo, Dutch painter, founder of the Van Loo family of painters (born 1614)
December – Bartholomeus van der Helst, Dutch portrait painter (born 1613)
December 24 – Jan Mytens, Dutch painter (born 1614)
date unknown
Angelica Veronica Airola, Italian painter (born 1590)
Isaac Briot, French engraver and draughtsman (born 1585)
Cheng Zhengkui, Chinese landscape painter and poet (born 1604)
Giovanna Garzoni, Italian woman painter of still-lifes of fruits, vegetables, and flowers (born 1600)
Jean Michelin, French Protestant painter (born about 1616)
Juan de Pareja, Spanish painter from Seville (born 1610)
probable
Luca Forte, Italian painter of still-lifes in Naples (born 1615)
Michele Pace del Campidoglio, Italian painter of fruit and flowers (born 1610)

 
Years of the 17th century in art
1670s in art